Luke James Bonner (born March 28, 1985) is a retired American professional basketball player.

Pro career 
Bonner started his professional career in 2009 with Hungarian club Albacomp, where he averaged 9.8 points and 3.8 rebounds, before signing for the Austin Toros of the NBA Development League in February 2010. At the beginning of the 2010–11 season, he signed with Lithuanian side Neptūnas. He spent one year and a half there, before rejoining the Toros in January 2012. However, he was waived due to injury one month later.

Personal life 
Luke is the younger brother of Matt Bonner, who is a former a National Basketball Association (NBA) player.

References

External links 
 NBA D-League Profile
 Profile at Eurobasket.com
 Luke Bonner at RealGM.com
 Luke Bonner at LKL.lt
 Luke Bonner at UMass Official Athletic Site

1985 births
Living people
American expatriate basketball people in Hungary
American expatriate basketball people in Lithuania
Austin Toros players
Basketball players from New Hampshire
American men's basketball players
Centers (basketball)
Sportspeople from Concord, New Hampshire
UMass Minutemen basketball players
West Virginia Mountaineers men's basketball players